Taylormade or Taylor Made may refer to one of several things:

TaylorMade, a golf equipment and apparel company
Taylormade Media, a New Zealand media graphics company founded by Ian Taylor (New Zealand businessman)
Taylor Made, former ring name of Tori (wrestler)

See also 

Tailor Made (disambiguation)